Round towers GAA is a Gaelic Athletic Association (GAA) club based in Kildare in County Kildare, Ireland winner of 10 Kildare county senior football championships , six as Round Towers, three as Kildare and one as St Patrick's.

History

Round Towers most recent Senior Football Championship wins came in 1996 defeating Johnstownbridge, 1998 defeating Clane and 2003 defeating Kilcock. Round Towers were relegated to Intermediate Football in 2012 after a defeat by one point to St Kevin's in the relegation play-off. Managed by Glenn Ryan, they won the Intermediate Championship in 2016 with a one-point victory of Two Mile House in a replay.

Notable persons
Glenn Ryan featured on the Kildare Football Team of the Millennium and was an All Star winner in 1997 and 1998. Karl O'Dwyer (son of Kerry's Mick O'Dwyer) and Brian Lacey were All Stars winners in 1998, and former Wexford hurler and 1989 All Star Éamonn Cleary played for the team in the 1990s. Referee Seamus Aldridge played for the club.

A separate club, Naomh Bríd or St Brigid's organises hurling in the town. Three Naomh Bríd players, Tommy Burke, Jack O'Connell, and Pat White were chosen on the Kildare hurling team of the millennium. The Fitzpatrick family founded another club, Mooretown, in the district – its only honour was the Junior C Championship of 1982.

Honours
 Kildare Senior Football Championship: Winners (10) 1927, 1929, 1930, 1938, 1954, 1959, 1961, 1996, 1998, 2003

Senior Committee 2022

Underage Club Officers 2022

Bibliography
 Kildare GAA: A Centenary History, by Eoghan Corry, CLG Chill Dara, 1984,  hb  pb
 Kildare GAA yearbook, 1972, 1974, 1978, 1979, 1980 and 2000– in sequence especially the Millennium yearbook of 2000
 Soaring Sliothars: Centenary of Kildare Camogie 1904–2004 by Joan O'Flynn Kildare County Camogie Board.

References

External links
Round Towers Site
Kildare GAA site
Kildare GAA club sites
Kildare on Hoganstand.com

Gaelic games clubs in County Kildare
Gaelic football clubs in County Kildare
Kildare (town)